Feel Good Lost is the debut studio album by Broken Social Scene. It was written and recorded primarily by founding members Kevin Drew and Brendan Canning. Unlike their better known 2002 outing You Forgot It in People, Feel Good Lost is mostly an instrumental, post-rock, ambient album, closer in style to BSS predecessor band KC Accidental, although it does feature some vocals by Leslie Feist and Kevin Drew.

Track listing
All songs written by Brendan Canning and Kevin Drew.

References

2001 debut albums
Broken Social Scene albums
Arts & Crafts Productions albums